Maja Shkurt is a mountain in northern Albania, part of the Prokletije range. It reaches a height of 2,499 meters (8,199 feet). The name means 'Small Peak' in Albanian.

Mountains of Albania
Accursed Mountains